The Sanpoil are a Native American people of the U.S. state of Washington.

Sanpoil may also refer to:
 Sanpoil River, a tributary of the Columbia River in Washington State
 M/V Sanpoil, the current Keller Ferry